The 1940 United States presidential election in Alabama took place on November 5, 1940, as part of the 1940 United States presidential election. Alabama voters chose 11 representatives, or electors, to the Electoral College, who voted for president and vice president. In Alabama, voters voted for electors individually instead of as a slate, as in the other states.

Alabama was won in a landslide by incumbent President Franklin D. Roosevelt (D–New York), running with Secretary of Agriculture Henry A. Wallace of Iowa with 85.22 percent of the popular vote, against corporate lawyer Wendell Willkie (R–New York), running with Senate Minority Leader Charles L. McNary of Oregon, with 14.34 percent of the popular vote, for a Democratic margin of 70.88 percent. Third-party candidates only managed to pick up 0.44 percent of the vote. Communist party candidate Earl Browder personally campaigned in the state giving speeches in Bullock County, Choctaw County, Clarke County, Coffee County, Conecuh County, Greene County and Hale County. Browder campaigned as an isolationist candidate advocating the United States not get involved in the war in Europe. Browder referred to the war as an "imperialist" war and he took a decidedly "anti-British tone" while campaigning in the aforementioned Alabama counties. In each of his speeches he condemned Winston Churchill and praised Joseph Stalin. However, Browder said he was "irked by how cold" the crowds there were towards him. In the seven counties where Browder campaigned he ultimately received zero votes in the election (however, in the state as a whole he won just over 500 votes in comparison to Roosevelt's 250,726 votes and Willkie's 42,184 votes.)

Results

Results by county

See also
United States presidential elections in Alabama

References

Alabama
1940
1940 Alabama elections